Theory of Everything is the second studio album by Australian indie rock band Children Collide. The album was recorded in Los Angeles and Melbourne, Australia. It was produced by Rob Schnapf in the United States and Woody Annison in Melbourne. The album was released by Universal in Australia on 27 August 2010. The first single, "Jellylegs", was released on 18 June 2010, and reached number 72 on the Australian ARIA Charts.

Several different special editions of the album were made available for pre-orders via the Children Collide website and other online stores. These included limited edition Tarot cards and limited edition singles.

Track listing

Charts

Personnel 
 Johnny Mackay – vocals, guitar
 Heath Crawley – bass
 Ryan Caesar – drums

Additional personnel 
 Rob Schnapf – production (tracks 2, 4, 5, 8 & 10), mixing
 Doug Boem – recording (tracks 2, 4, 5, 8 & 10), mixing
 Paul "Woody" Annison – production (tracks 1, 3, 6, 7, 9, 11, 12)
 Luke Postill – recording (tracks 1, 3, 6, 7, 9, 11, 12)
 Jason Mott – assistant engineer at the Sound Factory
 Chris Szczech – assistant engineer at the Sonora
 Leon Zervos – mastering
 Emily Hunt – artwork

References

2010 albums
Children Collide albums